Ablaevo (Ablay) is a rural locality (a selo) in Urnyaksky Selsoviet of Chekmagushevsky District, Bashkortostan, Russia. The population was 1,067 as of 2010. There are 9 streets.

Geography 
Ablaevo is located 24 km southeast of Chekmagush (the district's administrative centre) by road. Novobakayevo is the nearest rural locality.

References 

Rural localities in Chekmagushevsky District